Thaddeus Brown is the chief executive officer of Harris Blitzer Sports & Entertainment since 2021, which has holdings in the Philadelphia 76ers, New Jersey Devils, Prudential Center.

Career

Houston Rockets and Toyota Center  
As CEO, Brown was instrumental in persuading the NBA to choose the city of Houston as representatives for the 2013 and 2006 NBA All-Star Weekend, making Toyota Center the only NBA building to host two All-Star Games within a seven-year span. Brown also played a crucial role in signing James Harden in 2012 and re-signing him in 2017. Brown was also responsible for trading for Chris Paul in 2017, and trading away Chris Paul for Russell Westbrook in 2019. 

During the COVID-19 pandemic, Brown was actively involved in the organization's efforts to support front line workers and the local community. On April 14, 2021, Houston Rockets held their first Pride Night presented by Adidas and in alliance with the Greater Houston LGBT Chamber of Commerce. Brown commented that “it is our responsibility to celebrate all members of our community, including LGBTQ fans” and "“embracing inclusivity is something our team believes in strongly".

On April 23, 2021, Brown announced that he will be resigning from his CEO role at the end of the 2021 season. Brown joined the Rockets organization during the 2002-03 season as the VP of Corporate Development. Rockets owner Tilman Fertitta said, "On behalf of the entire Rockets organization and my family, I want to thank Tad for his stellar and tireless service to the Houston Rockets franchise.”

Harris Blitzer Sports & Entertainment 
On July 12, 2021, Brown was named the CEO of Harris Blitzer Sports & Entertainment and their holdings Philadelphia 76ers and New Jersey Devils.

Personal life 
Brown graduated from Colgate University, where he was captain of the varsity basketball team. He and his wife, Janice, have four daughters Kennedy (Stidham), Addison, Nicolette and Chloe and one grand daughter, Lennon Stidham. 

Brown's son-in-law is Denver Broncos quarterback Jarrett Stidham.

References

Year of birth missing (living people)
Living people
20th-century American businesspeople
American chief executives
Colgate Raiders men's basketball players
Houston Rockets executives
National Basketball Association executives